Lot 67 is a township in Queens County, Prince Edward Island, Canada.  It is part of Greenville Parish. Lot 67 was awarded to Robert Moore in the 1767 land lottery; but was sold for arrears of quitrent in 1781.

References

67
Geography of Queens County, Prince Edward Island